Lanzhou–Chongqing railway or Lanyu railway ("Lan" and "Yu" being the abbreviations for Lanzhou and Chongqing) is a higher-speed railway in China connecting Lanzhou and Chongqing. Construction started in 2010, last segment of the railway was opened for service in September 2017. The line allows trains to travel between Chongqing and Lanzhou, Gansu via Nanchong and Guangyuan, Sichuan.

Introduction 
The capacity of the line is expected at 50 train pairs per day and 50,000,000 tonnes of freight per year. The railway is designed to permit double-stack container operations.

Lanzhou–Chongqing railway project was estimated to need a total investment of 77.4 billion yuan, of which the Gansu Provincial Government invested about 43 billion yuan, with the rest of the funding was coming from a Ministry of Railways, Sichuan and Chongqing joint construction effort. The construction period was expected to take 6 years. Fast trains will complete the route in 5.5 hours.

Recent high speed rail reforms has also meant direct Chengdu-Lanzhou and Chongqing-Xi'an services will use a combination of Xi'an–Chengdu high-speed railway and Chongqing–Lanzhou high-speed railway from where they meet at Guangyuan, Sichuan. This will reduce the need for a separate direct Chongqing-Xi'an or Chengdu-Lanzhou line.

Twelve of the tunnels will exceed  in length, while the longest tunnel, West Qinling Tunnel, measures .

Route
Lanzhou–Chongqing railway runs west out of Lanzhou City through Yuzhong County, Weiyuan County, Min County, Tanchang County, Longnan City in Gansu. Crossing into Sichuan Province territory, it then travels by Guangyuan, Cangxi County, Langzhong, Nanbu County, Nanchong. Finally it enters Chongqing City via Hechuan District and Beibei District before terminating at Chongqing North railway station.

History
 August 1, 2008, West Qinling Tunnel as the first part of the project is opened for tender and bidding started, marking the start of Lanzhou–Chongqing railway construction.
 July 19, 2014, West Qinling Tunnel construction is completed.
 August 8, 2014, Nanchong East station branch opens with EMU services to Chengdu East
 January 1, 2015,  of the southern end of the project is opened. This allows for Chongqing to Hechuan EMU services in just 20 minutes.
 December 26, 2015, The southern section of the line, from Chongqing to Guangyuan, Sichuan, opened in December 2015. Initially with only conventional rail services.
 May 15, 2016, High speed EMU services commence with train D5131 running from Chongqing to Guangyuan station in a total of 3 hours 06 minutes.
 December 26, 2016, The section between Guangyuan, Sichuan and Minxian, Gansu was completed in December 2016. However, due to Minxian's small size and remote location, services will only commence to Longnan.
 September 29, 2017, The section between Minxian, Gansu and Lanzhou, Gansu was completed in September 2017.

Incidents
In October 2011, 21 railway workers were killed when the vehicle they were traveling in overturned in Lintao County, Gansu. Seven other workers were injured.

References

External links
 
 Lanzhou–Chongqing Railway Development Project

Railway lines in China
Rail transport in Chongqing
Rail transport in Gansu
Rail transport in Sichuan
25 kV AC railway electrification